Theodor Walter Hirsbrunner (2 April 1931 – 6 November 2010) was a Swiss musicologist and violinist.

Life 
Born in Thun, Hirsbrunner attended an old-language grammar school. He then studied violin with Walter Kägi in Bern and René Benedetti in Paris. From 1956 he studied musical composition and music theory (twelve-tone technique) with Sándor Veress and Wladimir Vogel. In the 1960s he attended a conducting course with Pierre Boulez in Basel.

From 1956 to 1987 he taught music theory, work analysis, and more recently, historical musicology at the Hochschule der Künste Bern. From 1968 to 1973 he conducted research at the Bibliothèque nationale de France. From 1979 to 1983 he taught at Boulez' request at the IRCAM. He gave lectures in Europe (e.g. at the Lucerne Festival), Australia (Adelaide 1979), Japan (Tokyo 1989), Taiwan (Taipei 1999) and the USA (Berkeley 1977 and Los Angeles 1987) as well as on representatives of Neue Musik at European radio stations (BR, WDR, RSR, RIAS, NDR, SFB and DRS). In addition to numerous articles for specialist journals, encyclopaedias and newspapers, he wrote five monographs on musical personalities (Debussy, Stravinsky, Boulez, Messiaen and Ravel) and two volumes on the history of music.

He has received several awards, including the Chevalier des Arts et des Lettres.

Hirsbrunner died in Bern at the age of 79.

Students 
 Jean-Luc Darbellay
 Hans Eugen Frischknecht
 Daniel Glaus
 Christian Henking
 Alfred Schweizer
 Robert Suter
 Jacques Wildberger

Awards 
 1978: Janáček-Medaille der Tschechoslowakei
 1984: Medaille of the UNESCO
 1989: Medaille of the Nissay-Theaters Tokio
 1996: Ehrendoktorwürde of the University of Bern
 1998: Chevalier des Arts et des Lettres
 2006: Grosser Musikpreis des Kantons Bern

Work 
 Debussy und seine Zeit. , Laaber 1981, .
 Igor Strawinsky in Paris. Laaber-Verlag, Laaber 1982, .
 Pierre Boulez und sein Werk. Laaber-Verlag, Laaber 1985, .
 Olivier Messiaen. Leben und Werk. Laaber-Verlag, Laaber 1988; 2nd expended edition 1999, .
 Maurice Ravel. Sein Leben, sein Werk.  Laaber-Verlag, Laaber 1989, 2nd expended edition u.d. T. Maurice Ravel und sein Werk. Laaber-Verlag, Laaber 2014, .
 Die Musik in Frankreich im 20. Jahrhundert. Laaber-Verlag, Laaber 1995, .
 Von Richard Wagner bis Pierre Boulez. Essays. Müller-Speiser, Anif 1997, .

Literature 
 Hirsbrunner, Theodor. In Brockhaus Riemann Musiklexikon. CD-Rom, Directmedia Publishing, Berlin 2004, .

References

External links 
 
 Theo Hirsbrunner bei Musinfo
 Literatur von Theo Hirsbrunner in the Bibliography of Music Literature
 

1931 births
2010 deaths
People from Thun
Music historians
Swiss musicologists
20th-century musicologists
Swiss classical violinists
Chevaliers of the Ordre des Arts et des Lettres
Ravel scholars
Debussy scholars
Stravinsky scholars